Akingam is a village in South Kashmir in the Anantnag district, in the Indian union territory of Jammu and Kashmir. In revenue records, the village of Akingam is still called Maqan Shiva Bhagwati. The adjacent villages are Mohripura, Hiller, Badasgam, Hardpora and Badoora.

Demographics 
As of the 2011 Census of India, there were 5,007 people, 2,026 workers and 755 families residing in Akingam. There were 2,579 males and 2,428 females. 17.93% of Akingam's total population, 898 people, were children aged 0–6.

The average sex ratio of Akingam was 941 females to 1,000 males, higher than the average of Jammu and Kashmir which was 889:1000. The child sex ratio of Akingam was lower than Jammu and Kashmir's average at 848:1000 to 862:1000.

In 2011, the literacy rate of Akingam was 67.41% whereas the literacy rate of Jammu and Kashmir was 67.16%. Akingam's male literacy rate was 76.40% while the female literacy rate was 58.09%.

Basic facilities 
The Govt.

The Govt. Primary Health  Center (PHC) Akingam is 20 meters away from main chowk Akingam

Jammu and Kashmir Bank branch is also located in the main chowk of Akingam. Its IFSC code is JAKA0AKNGAM. Moreover, there is also a post office, veterinary and sheep department office present in the village. 

Akingam had status of tourist village by government of Jammu and Kashmir with a well established tourist center. Village Akingam used to have Kashmiri Pandits Bhand performers but they left the village in 1990. The people of Akingam are deeply Sufi and philosophical in outlook.

Sacred places 
Akingam is surrounded by many heritage and sacred sites. Prominent ones include the temple of Goddess Shiva, the patron Goddess of Performing Arts, Ziyarat Sharief Sata Reshi Sahib and Ziyarat Shareef of the Islamic saint Shah-I-Asrar. It was given the status of tourist village by government of Jammu and Kashmir with a well established tourist center.

Shiva Bhagwati Temple

Famous Shrine of Jagad Amba Shri Shiva Bhagwati is situated at 240–250 meters (approx) from jammu and kashmir bank, Akingam.
The shrine is located on the foothills of beautiful forest with devdar and vast pastures.

Shiva Bhagwati Asthapan is the oldest sacred place of the area.

Schools

Asrar Memorial Public School Akingam
BMS, Bonapora Akingam
BPS, Akingam
 Government Higher Secondary School Akingam (GHSS Akingam)
GMS, Akingam
GPS, Bonapora Akingam
IPS, Akingam
KGBV, Akingam
MS Baghat Mohalla, Akingam
MS Renni, Akingam
PS Wani Mohalla, Akingam
Sadiq Memorial Institute, Hardpora, Akingam

See also
Fatehpora
Kumar Mohalla Akingam
Qazigund

References

External links 
'Run for laughter' held to promote Welcome 2 Karachi in The Times Of India
Mata Shiva Bhagwati’s birthday celebrated at Akingam Achabal - Scoop News Jammu Kashmir in The scoop news
Shiva Bhagwati Jayanti on June 21 in The daily excelsior
Mata Shiva Bhagwatiâs birthday celebrated at Akingam Achabal in The world news

 
Cities and towns in Anantnag district
Ancient Indian cities
Anantnag